"An Innocent Man" is a 1983 song performed by Billy Joel released as the third single from his album of the same name. The song, whose musical style is an homage to Ben E. King and the Drifters, reached No. 10 on the Billboard Hot 100 chart, the third consecutive top 10 single from the album. It also spent one week at No. 1 on the Billboard adult contemporary chart.

Joel was quoted in a 1997 interview describing the high notes he sang during the song: "I had a suspicion that was going to be the last time I was going to be able to hit those notes, so why not go out in a blaze of glory? That was the end of Billy's high note."

Reception
Cash Box said that "sounding soulful with a suburban lilt, Joel takes a cue from the Righteous Bros. in a performance that recalls Joel’s previous 'Until the Night.'"

Chart positions

Certifications

See also
List of number-one adult contemporary singles of 1984 (U.S.)

References

1983 singles
Billy Joel songs
Songs written by Billy Joel
Song recordings produced by Phil Ramone
Columbia Records singles
1983 songs